Summit Bridge is a road bridge over a canal, built in 1789. It crosses the Old Main Line of the Birmingham Canal Navigations in Smethwick, in the West Midlands, England; it was part of John Smeaton's improvements to the canal system at its highest point in the area.

It is a Grade II* listed building, listed on 8 February 2007. It is also a scheduled monument.

History and description
Summit Bridge was built in 1788–79, as part of a project carried out by John Smeaton to deal with the water shortages at the summit level, and to deal with traffic congestion by reducing the number of locks along the canal. Summit Bridge was built to carry Roebuck Lane across the cutting.

The bridge has a single span; it is built of red brick, with brick coping. On the north-west face there is a cast-iron plaque bearing the date "MDCCXC" (1790). The canal towpath is on the south-west side.

A short distance to the south, Galton Bridge carries Roebuck Lane over the
New Main Line, the adjacent canal built by Thomas Telford in the 1820s.

References

Birmingham Canal Navigations
Buildings and structures in Sandwell
Grade II* listed buildings in the West Midlands (county)
Grade II* listed bridges in England
Bridges in the West Midlands (county)
Road bridges in England
Smethwick